Hudi Graben is a settlement on the slopes of Mount Dobrča in the Municipality of Tržič in the Upper Carniola region of Slovenia.

References

External links 

Hudi Graben at Geopedia

Populated places in the Municipality of Tržič